San Martiño de Pazó (formerly Pazóo, and in ) is a parish (parroquia) in the east of the municipality of Allariz in the province of Ourense in Galicia, Spain.

A dispute by the abbess Guntroda, kinswoman of the powerful magnate Rodrigo Velásquez, led to a brief civil war in the mid-tenth century. Guntroda was succeeded by her relative Ilduara.

References

Geography of the Province of Ourense
Parishes of Galicia (Spain)